Paykan Club is an Iranian sports club based in Tehran, Iran. The club was founded in 1967.

Teams
Paykan Football Club, competing in the Iran Pro League
Paykan Volleyball Club, competing in the Iranian Super League
Paykan Cycling Club
Paykan Basketball Club

External links
Official website

Multi-sport clubs in Iran
Sports clubs established in 1967